John Kent (died 1413) was a politician from Reading in the English county of Berkshire.

John Kent was a mercer in the town of Reading and was elected Mayor there for the periods 1391–1392, 1393–1394, 1401–1402, 1405–1406 and 1409–1410. He was also elected a Member (MP) of the Parliament of England for Reading in October 1383, January 1390 and January 1404.

He is best remembered as a benefactor of St Laurence's Church where his memorial brass may still be seen.

References

People from Reading, Berkshire
English philanthropists
Mayors of Reading, Berkshire
Members of the Parliament of England (pre-1707) for Reading
14th-century births
1413 deaths
English MPs October 1383
English MPs January 1390
14th-century English businesspeople
English MPs January 1404